Skimskitta is the second studio album by Mira Calix. It was released by Warp Records in 2003.

Critical reception
At Metacritic, which assigns a weighted average score out of 100 to reviews from mainstream critics, Skimskitta received an average score of 70% based on 11 reviews, indicating "generally favorable reviews".

Andy Beta of Pitchfork gave the album a 7.3 out of 10, saying, "Skimskitta isn't particularly strong or potent, but it's relaxed and smooth enough to induce a very mellow, mild buzz."

Track listing

References

External links
 

2003 albums
Mira Calix albums
Warp (record label) albums